is a Japanese anime television series broadcast from February 13, 1982 to March 26, 1983, comprising 58 episodes. It is the sixth entry to the Time Bokan series by Tatsunoko Productions and the second series to feature a super robot as the main hero. The series succeeded Yattodetaman and preceded Itadakiman in 1983. The title character is playable in the fighting game Tatsunoko vs. Capcom: Ultimate All-Stars.

Story
In the 1990s-era Osteandel City is the headquarters of Time Lease, a business that leases almost everything you could ask for, including powerful robots. They are proud of themselves for being number one in the international ranking of billionaires for the past ten consecutive years. Meanwhile, there is another lease company in the same city called Skull Lease, where the notorious villain trio work as top executives. Their ostensible object is to disgrace the credit of Time Lease and replace them as the leading enterprise. However, they have a scheme to secure a footing for world conquest. One day, a transport robot of Time Lease is assaulted by the villain trio and Ippatsuman prepares to get on the move to fight for justice.

Cast

Time Lease
 Sokkyu Gou/Ippatsuman - Kei Tomiyama (Yasunori Matsumoto (Bokan GoGoGo), Masayuki Katō (Tatsunoko vs. Capcom))
 Ran Houmu - Eriko Hara
 Harubou - Noriko Tsukase
 2-3 - Masayuki Yamamoto
 Haruka Hoshi - Naoko Kōda
 Koizou Higeno - Daisuke Gōri (as Yoshio Nagahori)

Skull Lease

Osteandel Northern Branch
 Mun-Mun - Noriko Ohara
 Kosuinen - Jōji Yanami
 Kyokanchin - Kazuya Tatekabe
 Chinami - Issei Futamata
 Piiko - Mari Yokō
 Seiko - Kazuyo Aoki
 OL-san - Masako Katsuki
 Jukunen-san - Shigeru Chiba→Masashi Hirose
 Yangu - Shigeru Chiba
 Madogiwa-san - Masashi Hirose→Naoki Tatsuta
 Otoshima-san - Masako Katsuki→Reiko Suzuki
 Anna Touhoku - Kazue Komiya

Osteandel Western Branch
 Tamashirou Kakure - Shinya Ōtaki (as Susumu Ōtaki)
 Spy000 - Hirotaka Suzuoki

Head Office
 Con Cordo - Kaneta Kimotsuki
 Min-Min - Mika Doi

Machine Friend
 Ichiro Imai - Shigeru Chiba

Other
 Narration - Hirotaka Suzuoki

Episodes

References

External links
 
 逆転イッパツマン｜タイムボカンシリーズDVDコレクション

1982 anime television series debuts
Fuji TV original programming
Science fiction anime and manga
Tatsunoko Production
Time Bokan Series
Japanese time travel television series